Skittle Green is a hamlet in the civil parish of Bledlow-cum-Saunderton in the county of Buckinghamshire, England.

Skittle Green is northwest of the village of Bledlow, very near to the Oxfordshire boundary.

External links 

Hamlets in Buckinghamshire